Mateer is a surname. Notable people with the surname include:

Calvin Wilson Mateer (1836–1908), American Presbyterian missionary
Diehl Mateer (1928–2012), American hardball squash player and tennis player
Jeff Mateer, American lawyer
John Mateer (born 1971), South African-born Australian poet and author
Scott Mateer (1960–2006), American songwriter and radio disc jockey
Trista Mateer, American poet